Mieronice  is a village in the administrative district of Gmina Małogoszcz, within Jędrzejów County, Świętokrzyskie Voivodeship, in south-central Poland. The village has a population of 620.

References

Villages in Jędrzejów County